Rodrigo Moura Nascimento (born 1 November 2001) is a Brazilian professional footballer who plays as a goalkeeper for Chaves.

Professional career
A youth product of the Brazilian club Athletico Paranaense, Moura began his senior career with the Portuguese club Vilafranquense. He moved to Olhanense on loan for the 2019-20 season. He followed that up with a stint with Águeda the following season, before moving to the Liga Portugal 2 with Trofense in 2021. He transferred to Chaves on 29 June 2022, as they were newly promoted to the Primeira Liga.

References

External links
 

1996 births
Living people
People from La Vall d'Uixó
Brazilian footballers
Association football goalkeepers
U.D. Vilafranquense players
S.C. Olhanense players
R.D. Águeda players
G.D. Chaves players
Liga Portugal 2 players
Campeonato de Portugal (league) players
Brazilian expatriate footballers
Brazilian expatriates in Portugal
Expatriate footballers in Portugal